The 2005–06 Moldovan "B" Division was the 15th season of Moldovan football's third-tier league. There are 24 teams in the competition, in two groups, 12 in the North and 12 in the South.

"B" Division North

Final standings

"B" Division South

Final standings

External links 
 Moldova. Third Level 2005/06 - RSSSF
 "B" Division - moldova.sports.md

Moldovan Liga 2 seasons
3
Moldova